Torsh Kuh or Torshkuh may refer to:
 Torshkuh, Gilan
 Torsh Kuh, Kerman